Mwaro Province is one of the 19 provinces of Burundi. Its capital is Mwaro.

Mwaro Province one of two provinces that were created in 1999 as a result of splitting the Muramvya Province; the other province retained the name of Muramvya.

Communes
It is divided administratively into the following communes:

 Commune of Bisoro
 Commune of Gisozi
 Commune of Kayokwe
 Commune of Ndava
 Commune of Nyabihanga
 Commune of Rusaka

 
Provinces of Burundi